Terry Daniel is a former American football punter who played college football at Auburn University. He was a consensus All-American in 1993. Mississippi State Bulldogs coach Jackie Sherrill accused Daniel of filling footballs with helium in October 1993. He was cleared of any wrongdoing.

References

External links
College stats

Living people
Year of birth missing (living people)
Place of birth missing (living people)
Players of American football from Alabama
American football punters
Auburn Tigers football players
All-American college football players
People from Chambers County, Alabama